Spellbreak was a free-to-play, class-based third-person shooter video game developed by Proletariat for Microsoft Windows, PlayStation 4, Xbox One and Nintendo Switch, released on September 3, 2020.

On June 28th 2022, it was announced that Spellbreak would shutdown in early 2023 It was shut down on January 10, 2023.

Gameplay

Spellbreak was a projectile-based PvP shooter, however, unlike other shooters, it used gauntlets that fired magical spells in place of guns. Additionally, players could levitate and carry one 'Rune,' giving access to abilities like flight, teleportation or invisibility. Players could choose from one of six elemental classes: wind, fire, ice, lightning, stone and toxic, which granted in game benefits related to that element. Each player started with their class gauntlet permanently attached to them and could pick up one of the other five as a secondary. Gauntlets could deal a primary attack, called a spell, and a secondary attack, called a sorcery. Spells were limited by Mana which was an energy pool shared with levitation, while using a sorcery triggered a cooldown timer. Elements from different gauntlets could be combined to make spells more powerful, provide crowd control effects, or reduce others, depending on strategic desires. According to the developer the game also included role-playing and roguelike elements.

Game modes included battle royale and Clash, a team deathmatch. With the release of Chapter 2 on April 8, 2021, Dominion, a 5v5 mode featuring control points would replace Clash.

Development
The core combat was inspired by old school shooters like Quake and Unreal Tournament. At the time the Battle Royale genre was and CEO Seth Sivak remembers thinking "was really a competitive roguelike for people that didn’t play roguelikes" wondering "Could we do a cool, interesting fantasy version of that and make it into something awesome? All the mean while finishing it up with in 2 years and with a team of 6.’" The setting was decided on after the team realized that most Battle Royale games were gun based and felt that they could produce a fantasy themed version of the genre. According to executive producer Cardell Kerr the game was initially more "swords than sorcery" although the balance would eventually switch. The gameplay was influenced by such games as Unreal Tournament and Quake, while the visual design was influenced by such animated movies such as Akira and Princess Mononoke as well the TV show Avatar: The Last Airbender. Further inspiration for the visuals came from games with "gorgeous visual effects like 2D Castlevanias, League of Legends, and The Legend of Zelda: Breath of the Wild"

Proletariat announced in late June 2022 that they would stop working on further updates for Spellbreak as they had been acquired by Activision Blizzard and were transitioning to incorporate into Blizzard Entertainment's team that is in charge of developing World of Warcraft.

Reception 
Spellbreak received "generally positive" reviews for Microsoft Windows and Xbox One and "mixed or average" reviews for PlayStation 4 and Nintendo Switch, according to review aggregator Metacritic.

References

External links
 

2020 video games
Battle royale games
Fantasy video games
Free-to-play video games
PlayStation 4 games
Unreal Engine games
Windows games
Xbox One games
Nintendo Switch games
Video games developed in the United States